Waikato Basin may refer to:
The part of the Waikato Plains between Karapiro and Taupiri, New Zealand
The entire catchment of the Waikato River, New Zealand